

Wilhelm Wetzel (17 July 1888 – 4 July 1964) was a general in the Wehrmacht of Nazi Germany during World War II. He was a recipient of the Knight's Cross of the Iron Cross.

Awards and decorations

 Knight's Cross of the Iron Cross on 7 August 1942 as General der Infanterie and commander of V. Armeekorps

References

Citations

Bibliography

 

1888 births
1964 deaths
People from the Province of Pomerania
People from Lębork County
Generals of Infantry (Wehrmacht)
German Army personnel of World War I
Recipients of the clasp to the Iron Cross, 1st class
Recipients of the Gold German Cross
Recipients of the Knight's Cross of the Iron Cross
Reichswehr personnel
German Army generals of World War II